Justine Lerond (born 29 February 2000) is a French footballer who plays as a goalkeeper for Division 1 Féminine club Bordeaux and for the France national team.

Club career
Lerond joined Metz in 2015 and went on to become team's first-choice goalkeeper. On 10 August 2022, Bordeaux announced the signing of Lerond on a two-year deal until June 2024.

International career
Lerond was also part of the French team at the 2022 European Championships. Lerond has also represented the U20 France national team.

Career statistics

Honours
Metz
Division 2 Féminine: 2017–18

France U19
UEFA Women's Under-19 Championship: 2019

References

External links
 
 

2000 births
Living people
People from Metz
Women's association football goalkeepers
French women's footballers
France women's youth international footballers
France women's international footballers
FC Metz (women) players
FC Girondins de Bordeaux (women) players
Division 1 Féminine players
Division 2 Féminine players
UEFA Women's Euro 2022 players